Harold "Harry" Klein (25 December 1928 – 30 June 2010) was an English jazz saxophonist. As a session musician, he played on recordings by the Beatles.

Early in his career, Klein played with Nat Gonella in the late 1940s. He then played with Bill Le Sage and Kenny Baker before going on tour with Stan Kenton in 1956. Klein also worked with Stan Tracey for several years in the 1950s and 1960s. He also recorded with Tubby Hayes, Sammy Davis, Jr., Victor Feldman, Dudley Moore, and Champion Jack Dupree.

In the 1960s and 1970s, Klein began working as a studio musician for English pop and rock bands. Klein played on the Beatles' 1968 self-titled double album (also known as the "White Album"), on the songs "Honey Pie" (clarinet) and "Savoy Truffle" (saxophone). He was also one of the four saxophonists (along with Ronnie Scott) who played on "Lady Madonna". Other credits include playing on records by Caravan.

Discography
With Sammy Davis Jr
It's All Over but the Swingin' (Decca, 1957)

References

External links
[ Harry Klein] at Allmusic

British jazz saxophonists
British male saxophonists
1928 births
2010 deaths
People from Bethnal Green
British male jazz musicians
20th-century saxophonists